Hudiksvalls Tidning is a Swedish local newspaper published in Hudiksvall, Sweden.

History and profile
Hudiksvalls Tidning was founded in 1909. The paper is based in Hudiksvall. It is close to the Center Party. In 1999 the paper was partially acquired by the Centertidningar AB which was sold to VLT AB in 2005. The paper was published in tabloid format, but later it switched to Berliner format.

In 1998 Hudiksvalls Tidning sold 17,600 copies.

References

External links
Official website

1909 establishments in Sweden
Mass media in Hudiksvall
Newspapers established in 1909
Newspapers published in Sweden
Swedish-language newspapers